Malakhovka is the name of several inhabited localities in Russia.

Urban localities
Malakhovka, Moscow Oblast, a suburb of Moscow with historic dachas in Lyuberetsky District of Moscow Oblast;, classified as an urban-type settlement.

Rural localities
Malakhovka, Bryansk Oblast, a village in Kletnyansky District of Bryansk Oblast
Malakhovka, Kursk Oblast, a village in Rylsky District of Kursk Oblast
Malakhovka, Orenburg Oblast, a selo in Sorochinsky District of Orenburg Oblast
Malakhovka, Pskov Oblast, a village in Porkhovsky District of Pskov Oblast
Malakhovka, Saratov Oblast, a selo in Ozinsky District of Saratov Oblast
Malakhovka, Smolensk Oblast, a village in Roslavlsky District of Smolensk Oblast

References